Silber Pro Cycling Team was a Canadian UCI Continental cycling team established in 2013. The team began at the club-level as Team Medique (2012) and Team Medique p/b Silber Investments (2013), before gaining a UCI Continental license from 2014-2018 as Silber Pro Cycling. The General Direction was overseen by Scott Toguri McFarlane, a Montreal-based cycling coach and owner of Toguri Training. The Team Management and logistic was overseen by Claudine Gilbert. Gord Fraser was hired on a part-time basis in 2014 before becoming the full-time Sports Director from 2015-2018.

McFarlane initiated the team in 2012 to support his younger clients that were racing at the time, but Silber Pro Cycling became the best team in Canada and one of the best in North America for 5 years. Members of McFarlane & Fraser's teams went on to win National Championships, receive pro contracts and to represent their countries at the World Championships. In 2018, Arthur Silber stepped down as title sponsor, but the team was thrown a lifeline when Floyd Landis used  proceeds from the settlement of the Lance Armstrong whistleblower lawsuit to give back to cycling and to support younger riders. Landis became title sponsor of Floyd's Pro Cycling in 2019.

Team roster

Major wins
2015
Stage 5 Tour de Beauce, Ben Perry
Overall Grand Prix Cycliste de Saguenay, Matteo Dal-Cin
Stage 1, Matteo Dal-Cin
2016
 Time Trial Championships, Ryan Roth
Winston Salem Cycling Classic, Ryan Roth
Overall Grand Prix Cycliste de Saguenay, Ryan Roth
Stage 1, Ben Perry
Overall Redlands Bicycle Classic, Matteo Dal-Cin
Stage 1 Tour of Utah, Kris Dahl
2017
Stage 2 Grand Prix Cycliste de Saguenay, Émile Jean
Stage 3a (ITT) Tour de Beauce, Alec Cowan
2018
Stage 2 Joe Martin Stage Race, Alec Cowan
Stage 1 Tour de Beauce, Pier-André Coté

National champions
2015
 Canada U23 Time Trial, Alex Cataford
 Canada Road U23, Ben Perry 
 Canada Criterium, Ben Perry

2016
 Canada Time Trial, Ryan Roth
 Canada Road U23, Ben Perry 
 Canada Criterium, Ben Perry

References

UCI Continental Teams (America)
Cycling teams established in 2013
Cycling teams based in Canada